Melvin Twellaar (born 23 December 1996) is a Dutch rower and an Olympian. With Stef Broenink, he won the silver medal at the 2020 Summer Olympics in the double sculls event.

References

External links

1996 births
Living people
Dutch male rowers
Olympic rowers of the Netherlands
Rowers at the 2020 Summer Olympics
Rowers from Amsterdam
European Rowing Championships medalists
Medalists at the 2020 Summer Olympics
Olympic medalists in rowing
Olympic silver medalists for the Netherlands
World Rowing Championships medalists for the Netherlands
21st-century Dutch people